This is a timeline documenting the events of heavy metal music in the year 1987.

Newly formed bands

Addictive
Alastis
Alchemist 
Alice in Chains
Asphyx
Assück
Autopsy
Backyard Babies
Bad English
Biohazard 
Blue Murder
BulletBoys
Cynic
Danger Danger
Dangerous Toys
Danzig
Dead Horse
Defecation
Deicide
Devil Doll 
Disharmonic Orchestra
Electric Boys
Entombed
Epidemic 
Equinox 
Every Mother's Nightmare
Extremoduro
Femme Fatale
Fleshcrawl
Follow for Now
Gargoyle
Giant
Gorky Park 
Gun
Hamlet
Harem Scarem
Hermética
Heaven's Edge
Hobbs' Angel of Death
House of Lords 
Impellitteri
Impetigo 
Internal Void
Intruder
Ira
Junkyard
Kamelot
Kingdom Come
Kyuss
Lawnmower Deth
Lion's Share 
Little Caesar
Malevolent Creation
Master's Hammer
Meliah Rage
Meshuggah
Monumentum
Mortification
Nasty Idols
Ningen Isu
Nirvana
Nocturnus
Obliveon
Order from Chaos
Pariah
Pavor
Phantom Blue
Pink Cream 69
Porcupine Tree
Pretty Boy Floyd
Primordial
Re-Animator 
Ripping Corpse
Rollins Band
Root 
Rotting Christ
Roxus
Samael 
Sanatorium
Saraya
Secrecy
Seventh Angel
Shout
Sleeze Beez
Spiritus Mortis 
Sweaty Nipples
Terrorvision
Therion
Tiamat 
Transmetal 
Tyketto
U.D.O.
Ugly Kid Joe
Uncle Slam
Valhall 
Vengeance Rising
Veni Domine
Von 
Warrior Soul 
Winger
Zeni Geva

Albums & EPs

 Aerosmith - Permanent Vacation
 Agent Steel - Unstoppable Force 
 Alice Cooper - Raise Your Fist and Yell
 The Angels, aka Angel City – Live Line (live)
 Anthem - Bound to Break
 Anthrax - Among the Living
 Anthrax - I'm the Man (EP)
 Anvil - Strength of Steel
 Armored Saint - Raising Fear
 Artillery - Fear of Tomorrow
 Atomkraft – Conductors of Noize (EP)
 Autograph - Loud and Clear
 Barón Rojo - Tierra de Nadie
 Bathory - Under the Sign of the Black Mark
 Billy Idol – Vital Idol
 Bitch - The Bitch Is Back
 Black Sabbath - The Eternal Idol
 Blood Feast - Face Fate (EP)
 Blood Feast - Kill for Pleasure
 Bloodgood - Detonation
 Bonfire - Fireworks
 Burning Starr - Blaze of Glory
 Cacophony - Speed Metal Symphony
 Candlemass - Nightfall
 Carnivore - Retaliation
 Celtic Frost - Into the Pandemonium
 Paul Chain Violet Theatre - Opera 4th
 Chastain - The 7th of Never
 Chrome Molly - Stick It Out
 Coroner - R.I.P.
 The Cult - Electric
 Dead Brain Cells - Dead Brain Cells
 D.R.I. - Crossover
 Dirty Looks – I Want More
 Death - Scream Bloody Gore
 Death Angel - The Ultra-Violence
 Def Leppard - Hysteria
 Destruction - Mad Butcher (EP) 
 Paul Di'Anno's Battlezone – Children of Madness
 Dio - Dream Evil
 Dokken - Back for the Attack
 Earthshaker - Aftershock
 Excel - Split Image
 Exodus - Pleasures of the Flesh
 EZO - EZO
 Faith No More - Introduce Yourself
 Faster Pussycat - Faster Pussycat
 Frehley's Comet - Frehley's Comet
 Great White - Once Bitten
 Grim Reaper - Rock You to Hell
 Guns N' Roses - Appetite for Destruction
 Hades - Resisting Success
 Heathen - Breaking the Silence
 Helix - Wild in the Streets
 Hellion - Screams in the Night
 Helloween - Keeper of the Seven Keys: Part I
 Holy Moses - Finished with the Dogs
 Icon – A More Perfect Union
 Impellitteri – Impellitteri  (EP)
 Infernäl Mäjesty – None Shall Defy
 Intruder - Live to Die
 Jesters of Destiny - In a Nostalgic Mood (EP)
 Judas Priest - Priest...Live! 
 Kane Roberts - Kane Roberts
 Keel - Keel
 King Diamond - Abigail
 Kiss - Crazy Nights
 Kreator - Terrible Certainty
 Lȧȧz Rockit - Know Your Enemy
 Leatherwolf - Leatherwolf
 Liege Lord - Burn to My Touch
 Lion - Dangerous Attraction
 Lizzy Borden - Terror Rising  (EP)
 Lizzy Borden - Visual Lies
 Loudness - Hurricane Eyes
 Tony MacAlpine - Maximum Security
 Mad Max - Night of Passion
 Malibu Barbi - Rude Girls (EP)
 Mama's Boys – Growing Up the Hard Way
 Mammoth - Mammoth
 Manilla Road - Mystification
 Manowar - Fighting the World
 Masi - Fire in the Rain 
 Mayhem - Deathcrush (EP)
 McAuley Schenker Group - Perfect Timing
 Metal Massacre - Metal Massacre VIII (Compilation, various artists)
 Metallica - The $5.98 E.P. - Garage Days Re-Revisited (EP)
 Montrose – Mean
 Vinnie Moore - Mind's Eye
 Mötley Crüe - Girls, Girls, Girls
 Motörhead - Rock 'n' Roll
 Napalm Death - Scum
 Nasty Savage - Indulgence
 Necrophagia – Season of the Dead
 Neurosis – Pain of Mind
 John Norum - Total Control
 Obsession - Methods of Madness
 Odin – The Gods Must Be Crazy
 Omen - Nightmares (EP)
 Ozzy Osbourne - Tribute (live)
 Ostrogoth - Feelings of Fury 
 Overkill - Taking Over
 Paganini - It's a Long Way to the Top
 Paradox - Product of Imagination
 Pentagram - Day of Reckoning
 Phenomena – Phenomena II: Dream Runner
 Picture – Marathon
 Possessed - The Eyes of Horror (EP)
 Post Mortem – The Missing Link (EP)
 Pretty Maids - Future World
 Primal Scream – Volume One
 Prong - Primitive Origins (EP)
 Racer X - Second Heat
 Rage - Execution Guaranteed
 Raven - Life's a Bitch
 Rollins Band - Life Time
 Running Wild - Under Jolly Roger
 Rush - Hold Your Fire
 Sacred Child - Sacred Child
 Sacred Reich - Ignorance (album)
 Sacrifice - Forward to Termination
 Sacrilege – Within the Prophecy
 Saint Vitus - Thirsty and Miserable
 Sarcófago - I.N.R.I.
 Satan - Suspended Sentence
 Joe Satriani - Surfing with the Alien
 Savatage - Hall of the Mountain King
 Seikima-II - Big Time Changes
 Sepultura - Schizophrenia
 Shout - It Won't Be Long
 Sinner - Dangerous Charm
 Slaughter - Strappado
 Sodom - Persecution Mania
 Suicidal Tendencies - Join the Army
 Joey Tafolla - Out of the Sun
 Tankard - Chemical Invasion
 Taramis - Queen of Thieves
 Tarantula - Tarantula
 Testament - The Legacy
 Tigertailz - Young and Crazy
 TNT – Tell No Tales
 Tormé  – Die Pretty, Die Young
 Triumph – Surveillance
 Trouble - Run to the Light
 Twisted Sister - Love Is for Suckers
 Tygers of Pan Tang - Burning in the Shade
 U.D.O. - Animal House
 Unseen Terror - Human Error
 Vanadium – Corruption of Innocence
 Vengeance (Hol)  - Take It or Leave It
 Venom - Calm Before the Storm
 Victory - Hungry Hearts
 Viper - Soldiers of Sunrise
 Voivod - Killing Technology
 Vow Wow - V
 VXN - VXN (EP)
 Warlock - Triumph and Agony
 W.A.S.P. - Live...In the Raw 
 Whiplash - Ticket to Mayhem
 White Lion - Pride
 Whitesnake - Whitesnake
 Wild Dogs - Reign of Terror
 Wrath - Nothing to Fear
 Würzel – Bess (EP)
 Y&T - Contagious
 Zodiac Mindwarp - Tattooed Beat Messiah

Disbandments
 Alcatrazz (reformed in 2006)
 Sound Barrier (reformed in 2017)
 Twisted Sister (reformed in 2003)

Events
 Udo Dirkshneider departs Accept citing management issues, and later the same year forms U.D.O.
 Bon Jovi headlines the Monsters of Rock festival with Dio, Metallica, Anthrax, W.A.S.P. and Cinderella. Dee Snider, Bruce Dickinson and Paul Stanley join Bon Jovi to perform "We're an American Band" by Grand Funk.
 Motörhead's drummer Pete Gill leaves the band and Phil "Philthy Animal" Taylor returns.
 Mötley Crüe - Girls, Girls, Girls peaked at No. 2 in the Billboard charts.
 The show Headbangers Ball debuts on MTV on April 18, 1987.
 Bon Jovi's album Slippery When Wet tops the Billboard charts for eight weeks.
 In December 1987, Mötley Crüe bassist Nikki Sixx suffers a near-fatal heroin overdose.
 Bassist Louiche Mayorga leaves Suicidal Tendencies and is replaced by Bob Heathcote. At the same time, the band becomes a five piece as they hire former No Mercy guitarist Mike Clark as their rhythm guitarist.

1980s in heavy metal music
Metal